= Salon de l'Automobile =

Salon de l'Automobile may refer to:

- Geneva Motor Show
- Paris Motor Show
